Nurdin Hrustic (born November 5, 1988) is a Bosnian retired footballer who last played for Jacksonville Armada FC in the North American Soccer League.

Club career
Hrustic played one year of college soccer at Jacksonville University in 2008 and 2009, before joining the youth side of VfL Bochum, where he played until 2011. He spent a season with KFC Uerdingen 05, before moving back to the United States where trialled with USL Pro side Charleston Battery and eventually signed with NPSL club Jacksonville United in 2014.

Hrustic signed with North American Soccer League club Jacksonville Armada on January 14, 2015. He was released on February 4, 2016.

Personal life
He now works as a Mortgage Loan Processor in Jacksonville.

References

External links
 Armada bio

1988 births
Living people
People from Zvornik
Soccer players from Florida
Association football defenders
Bosnia and Herzegovina footballers
VfL Bochum II players
KFC Uerdingen 05 players
Jacksonville Dolphins men's soccer players
Jacksonville Armada FC players
Regionalliga players
National Premier Soccer League players
North American Soccer League players
Bosnia and Herzegovina expatriate footballers
Expatriate footballers in Germany
Bosnia and Herzegovina expatriate sportspeople in Germany
Expatriate soccer players in the United States
Bosnia and Herzegovina expatriate sportspeople in the United States